Etomoxir, or 2[6(4-chlorophenoxy)hexyl]oxirane-2-carboxylate, is an irreversible inhibitor of carnitine palmitoyltransferase-1 (CPT-1) on the inner face of the outer mitochondrial membrane. This prevents the formation of acyl carnitines, a step that is necessary for the transport of fatty acyl chains from the cytosol into the intermembrane space of the mitochondria. This step is essential to the production of ATP from fatty acid oxidation. Etomoxir has also been identified as a direct agonist of PPARα. An off-target effect has been demonstrated at high concentrations of etomoxir on Coenzyme-A (CoA) metabolism.

A double-blind crossover study in human adult males showed that treatment with etomoxir enhanced feelings of hunger and increased meal portion size by 22%.

Etomoxir has been reported to decrease the incorporation of palmitic acid and oleic acid into cardiolipin, although it does not affect the activities of cardiolipin biosynthesis and remodeling.

Etomoxir has off-target effects. At high concentrations, etomoxir inhibits complex I of the electron transport chain. Caution should be exercised when interpreting the metabolic effects of this compound.

Licensing and clinical development 
Etomoxir has already been through phase II clinical development for the treatment of type 2 diabetes and heart failure. Etomoxir went through preclinical trials by Byk Gulden laboratories (now Altana Pharma AG) from 1981 to 1984. From 1984 to 1993, etomoxir was developed through phase I and II trials that showed favorable effects on the heart and a good safety profile. In 1999, the patent was out-licensed to MediGene for further trials. In 2001, MediGene was granted extended patent rights for the use of etomoxir for the treatment of congestive heart failure. In 2002, MediGene announced that it terminated a phase II trial for the use of etomoxir for heart failure due to adverse side effects. MediGene funded a study of etomoxir as a treatment of heart failure in 2007, but the study was once again terminated prematurely. Four of the 226 patients taking the drug showed unacceptably high liver transaminase levels, which was determined by the experimenters to likely be due to the treatment. The University of Colorado currently holds patents for the use of etomoxir as an anti-inflammatory and anticarcinogenic agent. However, the clinical development of etomoxir has been terminated due to severe hepatotoxicity associated with treatment.

References 

Epoxides
Ethyl esters
Chloroarenes
Phenol ethers
Enzyme inhibitors